The Bailey Rocks are small chain of rocks in the Antarctic Windmill Islands which extends northeast from the north side of Bailey Peninsula into Newcomb Bay. They were first mapped from air photos taken by USN Operation Highjump, 1946–47, and observed in 1957 by Wilkes Station personnel under C. R. Eklund.

See also 
 Composite Antarctic Gazetteer
 List of Antarctic and sub-Antarctic islands
 List of Antarctic islands south of 60° S
 SCAR
 Territorial claims in Antarctica

References

External links 

Windmill Islands